The Chiefdom of Bozhou, ruled by the Yang clan, was an autonomous Tusi chiefdom established by Yang Duan during the Tang dynasty. After he conquered the Bozhou Prefecture (centred on modern Zunyi) from the Nanzhao Kingdom, Yang Duan was recognized as the hereditary ruler of the region by the Tang court in 876.

The Yang clan ruled Bozhou for more than seven centuries, surviving several dynastic changes in China, until its last ruler Yang Yinglong rebelled against the Ming dynasty in 1589. It took more than a decade for the Ming to suppress the rebellion, and the Bozhou Tusi was defeated and abolished in 1600.

Bozhou, Sizhou, Shuidong and Shuixi were called "Four Great Native Chiefdom in Guizhou" by Chinese.  "Liangguang [ruled by] Cen and Huang, Sizhou and Bozhou [ruled by] Tian and Yang", an idiom current among Southwestern Mandarin speakers, proved that the Yang clan was once one of the most powerful clans in Southwestern China.

History 
The Chiefdom of Bozhou was established in 876 when the first chieftain Yang Duan occupied Bozhou (modern-day Zunyi) in southwest China. It lasted for about 725 years over 29 generations through the Tang, Song, Yuan, and Ming dynasties. The main fortress of Bozhou was Hailongtun, constructed in 1257. About 17,000 Bozhou soldiers who were led by the 29th Chieftain Yang Yinglong fought against the 240,000 Ming Dynasty for 114 days. In the end the Tusi force was defeated and Yang Yinglong was killed. The Ming Dynasty burned down Hailongtun, and put an end to the 725 years rule of the Yang Family.

List of Bozhou Chieftains
Below are Bozhou chieftains

References 

Tusi
History of Guizhou
Zunyi
876 establishments
States and territories established in the 870s
States and territories disestablished in 1600